Parallel Lines is the third studio album by American rock band Blondie, released in September 1978, by Chrysalis Records to international commercial success. The album reached No. 1 in the United Kingdom in February 1979 and proved to be the band's commercial breakthrough in the United States, where it reached No. 6 in April 1979. In Billboard magazine, Parallel Lines was listed at No. 9 in the top pop albums year-end chart of 1979. The album spawned several successful singles, notably the international hit "Heart of Glass".

Background

Blondie's second studio album Plastic Letters was their last album produced by Richard Gottehrer, whose sound had formed the basis of Blondie's new wave and punk output. During a tour of the west coast of the US in support of Plastic Letters, Blondie encountered Australian producer Mike Chapman in California. Peter Leeds, Blondie's manager, conspired with Chrysalis Records to encourage Chapman to work with Blondie on new music. Drummer Clem Burke recalls feeling enthusiastic about the proposition, believing Chapman could create innovative and eclectic records. However, lead vocalist Debbie Harry was far less enthusiastic about Chapman's involvement as she knew him only by reputation; according to Chapman, her animosity towards him was because "they were New York. [He] was L.A.". Harry's cautiousness abated after she played Chapman early cuts of "Heart of Glass" and "Sunday Girl" and he was impressed.

Recording
In June 1978 the band entered the Record Plant in New York to record their third album, and first with Chapman. However, Chapman found the band difficult to work with, remembering them as the worst band he ever worked with in terms of musical ability, although praising Frank Infante as "an amazing guitarist". Sessions with Chris Stein were hampered by his being stoned during recording, and Chapman encouraged him to write songs rather than play guitar. Similarly, according to Chapman, Jimmy Destri would prove himself to be far better at songwriting than as a keyboardist, and Clem Burke had poor timing playing drums. As a result, Chapman spent time improving the band, especially Stein with whom Chapman spent hours rerecording his parts to ensure they were right. Bassist Nigel Harrison became so frustrated with Chapman's drive for perfection that he threw a synthesizer at him during recording. Chapman recalls the atmosphere at the Record Plant in an interview for Sound on Sound:

Chapman took an unorthodox approach when recording with Harry whom he describes as "a great singer and a great vocal stylist, with a beautifully identifiable voice. However ... also very moody". Chapman was far more cautious of demanding much from Harry as he saw her as a highly emotional person who would vest these emotions in the songs they made. He remembers Harry disappearing into the bathroom in tears for several hours at a time during recording. During a day of recording, Harry sang two lead parts and some harmonies, less work than she did previously with Gottehrer. This was due to Chapman encouraging her to be cautious about the way she sang, particularly to recognise phrasing, timing and attitude.

Blondie recorded Parallel Lines in six weeks, despite being given six months by Terry Ellis, co-founder of Chrysalis Records, to do so. For the drums, a traditional set-up was used and Chapman fitted Neumann microphones to the toms, snare and hi-hat, as well as several above the site. When recording, Chapman would start with the bass track, which was difficult to record at the time, by way of "pencil erasing". Chapman explained in an interview for Sound on Sound, "that meant using a pencil to hold the tape away from the head and erasing up to the kick drum. If a bass part was ahead of the kick, you could erase it so that it sounded like it was on top of the kick. That's very easy to do these days, but back then it was quite a procedure just to get the bottom end sounding nice and tight." A combination DI/amp method was used to record Harrison's bass and Destri's synthesizer. Shure SM57 and AKG 414 microphones were used to capture Infante's Les Paul guitar. King Crimson leader Robert Fripp makes a guest appearance on guitar on "Fade Away and Radiate".

After the basic track was complete, Chapman would record lead and backing vocals with Harry. However, this process was hampered by many songs not being written in time for the vocals to be recorded. "Sunday Girl", "Picture This" and "One Way Or Another" were all unfinished during the rehearsal sessions. When recording vocal parts, Chapman remembers asking Harry if she was ready to sing, only for her to reply "Yeah, just a minute" as she was still writing lyrics down. Chapman notes that many "classic" songs from the album were created this way.

During the last session at the Record Plant, the band were asleep on the floor only to be awakened at six o'clock in the morning by Mike Chapman and his engineer Peter Coleman leaving for Los Angeles with the tape tracks. Despite Blondie's belief that Parallel Lines would resonate with a wider audience, Chrysalis Records was not as enthusiastic; label executives told them to start again, only to be dissuaded by Chapman's assurance that its singles would prove popular.

Music and lyrics 
According to music journalist Robert Christgau, Parallel Lines was a pop rock album in which Blondie achieved their "synthesis of the Dixie Cups and the Electric Prunes". Its style of "state-of-the-art pop/rock circa 1978", as AllMusic's William Ruhlmann described it, showed Blondie deviating from new wave and emerging as "a pure pop band". Ken Tucker believed the band had eschewed the "brooding artiness" of their previous albums for more hooks and pop-oriented songs. Chapman later said, "I didn't make a punk album or a New Wave album with Blondie. I made a pop album." The album's eleven pop songs have refined melodics, and its sole disco song, "Heart of Glass", features jittery keyboards, rustling cymbals by drummer Clem Burke, and a circular rhythm. Burke credited Kraftwerk and the soundtrack to the film Saturday Night Fever as influences for the song and said that he was "trying to get that groove that the drummer for the Bee Gees had".

Lyrically, Parallel Lines abandoned what Rolling Stone magazine's Arion Berger called the "cartoonish postmodernist referencing" of Blondie's previous new wave songs in favor of a "romantic fatalism" that was new for the band. "Sunday Girl" deals with the theme of teen loneliness. Music critic Rob Sheffield said that the lyric "dusty frames that still arrive / die in 1955", in "Fade Away and Radiate", is the "best lyric in any rock'n'roll song, ever, and it's still the ultimate statement of a band that always found some pleasure worth exploiting in the flashy and the temporary."

Title and packaging 
Parallel Lines took its name from an unused track written by Harry, the lyrics of which were included in the first vinyl edition of the album. The cover sleeve image was photographed by Edo Bertoglio and was chosen by Blondie's manager, Peter Leeds, despite being rejected by the band. The photo shows the band posing in matching dress suits and smiling broadly in contrast to Harry who poses defiantly with her hands on her hips while wearing a white dress and high heels. According to music journalist Tim Peacock, the cover became "iconic – and instantly recognisable".

Release and promotion 
The album was released by Chrysalis in September 1978, to international success. The album entered the Billboard album chart the week ending September 23, 1978 at No. 186, reflecting retail sales during the survey period ending September 10, 1978. In the United Kingdom, it entered the albums chart at  No.13, eventually reaching the no.1 spot in February 1979 after the band had scored hits with the singles "Picture This" (UK #12), "Hanging on the Telephone" (UK #5), and "Heart of Glass" (UK #1). "Sunday Girl" was released in the UK as a fourth single from the album in May 1979 and also reached no.1, and Parallel Lines became the UK's biggest selling album of the year. Blondie embarked on a sold-out tour of the UK and appeared at an autograph signing event for Our Price Records on Kensington High Street; according to Peacock, it "descended into Beatlemania-esque chaos when the band were mobbed by thousands of fans".

Parallel Lines was also a commercial success elsewhere in Europe, Australia, and the United States, where the band had struggled to sell their previous records. "Heart of Glass" became their first number-one hit on the American Billboard Hot 100, with help from a promotional video directed by Stanley Dorfman depicting Blondie in a performance of the song at a fashionable nightclub in New York. The single was "responsible for turning the band into bona fide superstars", Peacock said.

Critical reception 

The album was met with universal acclaim from critics. Writing in The Village Voice in 1978, Robert Christgau said although Blondie still could not write a perfect hit single, the record was a consistent improvement over Plastic Letters. Years later, he wrote in Blender that it was "a perfect album in 1978" and remained so with "every song memorable, distinct, well-shaped and over before you get antsy. Never again did singer Deborah Harry, mastermind Chris Stein and their able four-man cohort nail the band's signature paradoxes with such unfailing flair: lowbrow class, tender sarcasm, pop rock." New York Times critic John Rockwell named Parallel Lines the eighth best album of 1978. Daryl Easlea from BBC Music, who felt the record combined power pop and new wave styles, credited Mike Chapman's production and flair for pop songwriting for helping make Parallel Lines an extremely popular album in the United Kingdom, where it was a number-one hit and charted for 106 weeks during the late 1970s. Q magazine called the album "a crossover smash with sparkling guitar sounds, terrific hooks and middle-eights more memorable than some groups' choruses."

In a retrospective appraisal of 1970s post-punk albums, Spin magazine's Sasha Frere-Jones said Parallel Lines may have been "the perfect pop-rock record" and Blondie's best album. Christian John Wikane from PopMatters later called it "a creative and commercial masterpiece by Blondie ... indisputably one of the great, classic albums of the rock and roll era." In the opinion of Pitchfork critic Scott Plagenhoef, the album popularized "the look and sound of 1980s new wave" with classic songs that showcased the depth and complexity of Harry's sexuality and singing. Sal Cinquemani from Slant Magazine was also impressed by her singing, which he felt varied from "purring like a kitten and then building to a mean growl", and cited "Heart of Glass" as the album's best track because of her "honey-dipped vocal".

In 2000, Parallel Lines was voted number 57 in Colin Larkin's book All Time Top 1000 Albums. Three years later, it was ranked at number 140 on Rolling Stones list of the 500 greatest albums of all time, maintaining the rating in a 2012 revised list; an accompanying essay said the album was "where punk and New Wave broke through to a mass U.S. audience". It has also been placed at number 18 and 45 on NMEs 100 Best Albums of All Time (2003) and 500 Greatest Albums of All Time (2013) lists, respectively; number 7 on Blenders 100 Greatest American Albums of All Time; number 94 on Channel 4's 2005 list of the 100 greatest albums of all time; and number 76 on Pitchforks list of the best albums from the 1970s.

Reissues 
The album was reissued and remastered in 2001 along with Blondie's back catalog, and featured four bonus tracks: a 1978 demo of "Heart of Glass", a live cover of T. Rex's song "Bang a Gong (Get It On)", and two live tracks taken from the Picture This Live live album.

On June 24, 2008, an expanded 30th Anniversary Edition of the album was released, which featured new artwork and bonus tracks along with bonus DVD. The liner notes once again featured lyrics to the unfinished "Parallel Lines" song. The Parallel Lines 30th Anniversary Edition included the 7″ single version of "Heart of Glass", the French version of "Sunday Girl" and some remixes, plus a DVD with albums, promo videos and TV performance.

The band also launched a world tour of the same name to promote the re-release and celebrate the event.

Track listing

Notes
 The album version of "Heart of Glass" was replaced with the disco version (5:50 long) on pressings of the album from March 1979 onward. The original length version of "Heart of Glass" appeared on the original US CD release in 1985 (Chrysalis VK 41192, later F2 21192) although the CD artwork proclaimed it was the disco version. Later editions of the Capitol disc had the mistake removed from the inlay but it remained on the disc until its deletion.  The 1994 DCC Compact Classics Gold CD release (Capitol Special Markets USA GSZ 1062) features the original version with the disco version as a bonus track.
 A promotional CD of the album was given away free with the British newspaper The Mail on Sunday on December 5, 2010, including the bonus tracks "What I Heard" and "Girlie Girlie" from the band's 2011 album Panic of Girls.

Personnel
Credits adapted from the liner notes of Parallel Lines.

Blondie
 Jimmy Destri – electronic keyboards
 Frank Infante – guitar, co-lead vocals on "I Know but I Don't Know"
 Chris Stein – guitar, 12-string, E-bow
 Nigel Harrison – bass
 Clem Burke – Premier drums
 Deborah Harry – vocals

Additional personnel
 Mike Chapman – production, backing vocals on "Hanging on the Telephone"
 Pete Coleman – production assistance, engineering
 Grey Russell – engineering assistance
 Steve Hall – mastering at MCA Whitney Studio (Glendale, California)
 Robert Fripp – guitar on "Fade Away and Radiate"
 Edo Bertoglio – photography
 Ramey Communications – art direction, design
 Frank Duarte – illustration
 Jerry Rodriguez – lettering
 Kevin Flaherty – production (2001 reissue)

Charts

Weekly charts

Year-end charts

Certifications and sales

Notes

References

Bibliography

Further reading
 

1978 albums
Albums produced by Mike Chapman
Albums recorded at Record Plant (New York City)
Blondie (band) albums
Chrysalis Records albums